Yoram Koren is an Israeli-American academic. He is the James J. Duderstadt Distinguished University Professor Emeritus of Manufacturing and the Paul G. Goebel Professor Emeritus of Engineering at the University of Michigan, Ann Arbor.
Since 2014 he is a distinguished visiting professor at the Technion – Israel Institute of Technology. 
 
Koren has been made a member of the National Academy of Engineering (NAE), and an honorary member of the Society of Manufacturing Engineers (SME). He is a Fellow of the International Academy for Production Engineering (CIRP), the Society of Manufacturing Engineers (SME), the American Society of Mechanical Engineers (ASME), and of the Institute of Electrical and Electronics Engineers (IEEE) “for contributions to flexible automation and manufacturing systems”.

Early life and education
Yoram Koren was born in Tel-Aviv, Mandatory Palestine.  He studied at Ironi Alef High School in Tel-Aviv and served at the Israeli Air Force as an electronics technician. 

He received B.Sc. in Electrical Engineering from the Technion - Israel Institute of Technology, in 1965. His M.Sc. was received from the same department in 1968. He continued his Ph.D. studies in Mechanical Engineering at the Technion and graduated in January 1971.
His thesis on "Model and Optimization of a Machining Process and its Control", was supervised by Prof. Ehud Lenz.

Career
Koren started his career at the Technion–Israel Institute of Technology, where he was a lecturer from 1971 to 1973, and a professor from 1975 to 1985. Koren was the head of the Technion Robotics Laboratory from 1982 to 1985. From 1980 to 1982, Koren was on sabbatical and leave of absence at the University of Michigan, where he was the Paul G. Goebel Visiting Professor of Engineering. In 1986 he joined U-M as a tenured professor, and in 1993 he was approved as the Paul G. Goebel Professor of Engineering by the board of regents. In 2010 Koren was named the James J. Duderstadt Distinguished University Professor of Manufacturing.
 
Koren retired in 2014, becoming a professor emeritus. Since 2015 Koren has been a distinguished visiting professor at Technion, where he was also the Edmond J. Safra Distinguished Visiting Professor Chair in 2007.
 
Koren is the founding director (in 1996) of the NSF-sponsored Engineering Research Center (ERC) for Reconfigurable Manufacturing Systems (RMS), an ERC that was financially sponsored (at $47 million) by the National Science Foundation and 25 industrial companies until 2012. Under Koren's leadership, 70 Ph.D. students and 270 M.S. graduated from the RMS center.

Research
Koren is a member of the U.S. National Academy of Engineering (NAE) “For contributions to the science, education, and practice of manufacturing through innovations in reconfigurable manufacturing systems, robotics, and manufacturing system control”.
 
Koren holds at least 14 U.S. patents in these fields. He has published 4 books and more than 300 scholarly papers that have over 31,000 citations, with an h-index of 77 (according to Google Scholar).

Flexible Automation and CNC
Koren's research in the 1970s was focused on developing methods for the precise control of CNC (computer numerically controlled) machines aimed at enhancing their precision and increasing their productivity. In 1973 Koren invented the first computerized real-time adaptive controller for a milling machine. In 1976 Koren published the first scientific paper on interpolators for CNC machines.
In 1980 he published the Cross-Coupled Controller, which coordinates the output of two control loops for enhancing CNC precision by software.

Robotics
Koren started his robotics research (and mobile robot research in particular) in 1980. Koren and Johann
Borenstein developed the autonomous mobile robot CARMEL (Computer-Aided Robotics for Maintenance, Emergency, and Life-support), featured on a CNN national program in 1988.
CARMEL's motion algorithms are described in [Papers 9, 10]. In 1992, CARMEL won the first Autonomous Mobile Robot Competition sponsored by the Association for the Advancement of Artificial Intelligence.

In 1991 Koren received a grant of $220,000 to develop “Sensor-Based Control of a Mechanical Snake. Shan and Koren built a 7-link snake; its first link had a camera, and 6 motors were installed at the 6 joints to provide forward motion. Shan and Koren were the first to develop a model of how external objects could affect kinematic constraints on the movement of a snake robot in 1993.

Reconfigurable Manufacturing Systems (RMS)
Koren is the inventor of the Reconfigurable Machine Tool, the Reconfigurable Manufacturing Systems, and the Reconfigurable Apparatus for Inspection.
Koren introduced the RMS structural architecture and its benefits to the international manufacturing research community in 1999. Koren presented at the CIRP Annual Meeting in France the keynote paper “Reconfigurable Manufacturing Systems”,  defining RMS as: “A manufacturing system that has an adjustable structure that enable rapid system scalability in response to market demands, and system adaptability to new products”.  He is credited with identifying the basic principles of such systems.

Mass-Individualization
Koren proposed a new manufacturing system architecture that enables producing Market-of-One products at affordable cost. [Papers 14, 15]. To achieve buyer's satisfaction, proximity between the mass-individualization factory and the customer is required.

Books
 
 
  (This book was also translated by the publisher to Japanese and French) 
  (This book was also translated to Chinese).

Selected articles

RMS

CNC

Robotics

Mass-Individualization

Honors and awards

 CIRP Fellow (1985) 
 SME Fellow (1987)
 ASME Fellow (1990)
 Member of National Academy of Engineering (2004)
 Hideo Hanasufa Outstanding Investigator Award (2004)
 M. Eugene Merchant Manufacturing Medal of ASME/SME (2006)
 Yoram and Alina Koren Conference Room at the University of Michigan (2012)                                                                   
 IEEE Life Fellow (2013)
 SME Honorary Member (2015)

Personal life
Yoram is married to Alina (MA in literature) who was a lecturer at the University of Michigan, and they have two children: Shlomy and Esther (who died in October 2020).

References 

Fellow Members of the IEEE
Living people
Technion – Israel Institute of Technology alumni
Year of birth missing (living people)
University of Michigan faculty
Academic staff of Technion – Israel Institute of Technology